Higher Wincombe is a farm and small hamlet in the parish of Donhead St Mary, Wiltshire, England. It lies at the head of the Nadder Valley, just beyond the north-east edge of the town of Shaftesbury, Dorset and within the Cranborne Chase and West Wiltshire Downs Area of Outstanding Natural Beauty.

History 
There was a hamlet called Wincombe by the later 18th century, which was recorded as Higher Wincombe when it was surveyed by the Ordnance Survey in 1886. Wincombe farm was built in the second half of the 18th century (although the barn may have been built in the earlier part of that century) and was enlarged in the 19th century.

The hamlet, together with the lands of Higher Wincombe Farm shouldering the border with Dorset, was requisitioned in 1943 by the Ministry of Works for the war effort and became the Wincombe Y Station which was at first operated by the General Post Office (GPO). From the 1950s to 1983 the site was operated by the National Security Agency (NSA) of the United States in conjunction with GCHQ. The site was also known as RAF Wincombe, and for a time came under RAF Upper Heyford as part of the United States Air Force in the United Kingdom. The USAF designated Higher Wincombe as a Radio Beacon Site, and it was also known as Operating Location-J (OL-J) of the European Communications Area (ECA) and housed Detachment 4. After the closure of operations in 1977, the decommissioning of the site took a number of years with the site's last elements being handed over in 1983. The hamlet's properties had been returned to private residences in 1980.  

Over the years, the lanes to the east which joined Higher Wincombe to Donhead St Mary and other hamlets in the parish have been downgraded to bridleways. The hamlet is now only accessible via Wincombe Lane – a private road and bridleway – from Shaftesbury. The lane had an avenue of beech trees, established for over 200 years, until they were felled in the 1970s.

References 

Hamlets in Wiltshire
Military history of Wiltshire
Y service